, also credited as Mako Hyoudou, is a Japanese actress, voice actress and singer from Tokyo, Japan.

Notable roles
 Girl in Angel's Egg
 Christella Revi in Birdy the Mighty: Decode
 Young Lady in The Red Spectacles
 Sharon Apple in Macross Plus
 Quanzitta Marison in Madlax
 Mayumi (Part 1) and Young Girl (Part 2) in Twilight Q
 Kogane Musashi in Ranma 1/2 Creator (female) in Maze Ayaka Tateyama in Mekakucity Actors Hamushi in Outlaw Star Helena Bähbem in RahXephon Kōmi Natsuki in Sakura Diaries Kusumi in The Sky Crawlers Mazenda in Slayers NEXT Aphrodite in Wedding Peach Colonel Felme in Zoids: Genesis Foxy Croquette O-Gin in Tachiguishi-Retsuden Foxy Croquette O-Gin in Onna Tachiguishi-Retsuden Foxy Croquette O-Gin in Shin Onna Tachiguishi-Retsuden''

Tokusatsu
 Snake Lord/Anguis Femineus in Kamen Rider Agito
 Respider in Kamen Rider Ryuki

References

External links 
 
 

1962 births
Living people
People from Tokyo
Actresses from Tokyo
Singers from Tokyo
Voice actresses from Tokyo
Japanese child actresses
Japanese women singers
Japanese video game actresses
Japanese voice actresses
81 Produce voice actors